300ER may refer to:
Boeing 767-300ER, aircraft variant
Boeing 777-300ER, aircraft variant